{{Infobox person
| name               = Nancee Oku Bright
| image              = Lobé_Ndiaye.jpg
| imagesize          = 
| alt                = 
| caption            = 
| birth_name         = 
| birth_date         =8 September 1971
| birth_place        = Dakar
| death_date         = 
| death_place        = 
| notable_works      = * Sirènes de la nuit, 2016
 Une perle en éclats, L'Harmattan, 2017
|known_for    = 'La femme lionne (The Woman Lioness),
| awards             =  Dada Gbêhanzin Award
| othername          =
| occupation         = 
| yearsactive        = 
| party              = 
| spouse                = 
| alma_mater         = 
| children              = 
| nationality        = Senegalese
| citizenship        = Senegalese
| mother             =
| father             = 
| website            = 
}}

Lobé Ndiaye (Dakar, 8 September 1971) is a Senegalese writer and documentary filmmaker. She won the Dada Gbêhanzin Award in 2019.

Novels
 Sirènes de la nuit, 2016
 Une perle en éclats, L'Harmattan, 2017

FilmsLa femme lionne (The Woman Lioness)'', 2018

References

1971 births
Living people
Women documentary filmmakers
Senegalese women film directors
Senegalese film directors
Senegalese women writers
Senegalese writers
People from Dakar